Gardsjøen is a lake in Sør-Varanger Municipality in Troms og Finnmark county, Norway.

See also
List of lakes in Norway

References

Sør-Varanger
Lakes of Troms og Finnmark